Peter Orlando Hutchinson (1810–1897) was an English Victorian diarist and artist. He was born in Winchester, but spent all his adult life in Sidmouth, Devon.

Hutchinson was a polymath whose interests ranged from politics to the preservation of telephone poles. He was also an amateur musician (flute and French horn) as well as a stonecarver. His major achievement, however, was a series of diaries and sketchbooks, containing observations on the geology, archaeology, botany and other items of interest relating to East Devon.

In his capacity as a stonecarver, he helped to save and restore the Old Chancel in Sidmouth. He was on the Committee for the restoration of the parish church in 1860, but felt that not enough of the original building was being preserved, so he bought and re-erected the chancel in his own garden, later attaching it to his house.

He was also a great-grandson of Massachusetts governor Thomas Hutchinson of Boston Tea Party fame. In 1837-38 he visited the United States and Canada, where he made over a hundred sketches. In 1880, he helped organize and publish his great-grandfather's papers.

A display devoted to Hutchinson, including many of his personal items, can be seen at Sidmouth Museum.

References

External links
 
Devon Museums: "Peter Orlando Hutchinson of Sidmouth, Devon 1810 to 1897" (pamphlet) by Catherine Linehan

1810 births
1897 deaths
19th-century English artists
People from Sidmouth
English diarists
English male non-fiction writers
19th-century diarists
Writers from Devon